Bamyan Province also spelled Bamiyan, Bāmīān or Bāmyān is one of the thirty-four provinces of Afghanistan, located in central Afghanistan. 

The terrain in Bamyan is mountainous or semi-mountainous, at the western end of the Hindu Kush mountains concurrent with the Himalayas. The province is divided into eight districts, with the town of Bamyan serving as its capital. The province has a population of about 495,557 and borders Samangan to the north, Baghlan, Parwan and Wardak to the east, Ghazni and Daykundi to the south, and Ghor and Sar-e Pol to the west. It is the largest province in the Hazarajat region of Afghanistan and is the cultural capital of the Hazara ethnic group that predominates in the area.

It was a center of commerce and Buddhism in the 4th and 5th centuries. In antiquity, central Afghanistan was strategically placed to thrive from the Silk Road caravans that crisscrossed the region, trading between the Roman Empire, Han Dynasty, Central Asia, and South Asia. Bamyan was a stopping-off point for many travelers. It was here that elements of Greek and Buddhist art were combined into a unique classical style known as Greco-Buddhist art.

The province has several famous historical sites, including the now-destroyed Buddhas of Bamiyan, around which are more than 3,000 caves, the Band-e Amir National Park, Dara-i-Ajhdar, Gholghola and Zakhak ancient towns, the Feroz Bahar, Astopa, Klegan, Gaohargin, Kaferan and Cheldukhtaran.

History

Ancient 
Archaeological exploration done in the 20th century suggests that the geographical area of Afghanistan has been closely connected by culture and trade with its neighbors to the east, west, and north. Artifacts typical of the Paleolithic, Mesolithic, Neolithic, Bronze, and Iron Ages have been found in Afghanistan. Urban civilization is believed to have begun as early as 3000 BC, and the early city of Mundigak (near Kandahar in the south of the country) may have been a colony of the nearby Indus Valley civilization.

After 2000 BC, successive waves of semi-nomadic people from Central Asia began moving south into Afghanistan; among them were many Indo-European-speaking Indo-Iranians. These tribes later migrated further south to India, west to what is now Iran, and towards Europe via the area north of the Caspian Sea. The region as a whole was called Ariana.

The people shared similar culture with other Indo-Iranians. The ancient religion of Kafiristan survived here until the 19th century. Another religion, Zoroastrianism is believed by some to have originated in what is now Afghanistan between 1800 and 800 BC, as its founder Zoroaster is thought to have lived and died in Balkh. Ancient Eastern Iranian languages may have been spoken in the region around the time of the rise of Zoroastrianism.

By the middle of the 6th century BC, the Achaemenid Persians overthrew the Medes and incorporated Arachosia, Aria, and Bactria within its eastern boundaries. An inscription on the tombstone of King Darius I of Persia mentions the Kabul Valley in a list of the 29 countries that he had conquered.

In 330 BC, Alexander the Great seized the area but left it to the Seleucids to rule.

Afghanistan's significant ancient tangible and intangible Buddhist heritage is recorded through wide-ranging archeological finds, including religious and artistic remnants. Buddhist doctrines are reported to have reached as far as Balkh even during the life of the Buddha (563 BC to 483 BC), as recorded by Husang Tsang. It became the site of an early Buddhist monastery. "Buddhism was by this time in an expansionist mode, offering religious practices that spoke to the masses and an appealing style of illustrative art, backed by the subtle philosophy of the Mahayana sect"  Many statues of Buddha were carved into the sides of cliffs facing Bamyan city. The two most prominent of these statues were standing Buddhas, now known as the Buddhas of Bamyan, measuring 53 and 40 meters high respectively, which were the largest examples of standing Buddha carvings in the world. They were probably erected in the 4th or 5th century A.D. They were cultural landmarks for many years and are listed among UNESCO's World Heritage Sites. In March 2001 the Taliban government decreed that the statues were idolatrous and ordered them to be demolished with anti-aircraft artillery and explosives.

By the 7th century, when the Arabs first arrived, it was under the control of the Turk Shahis before being conquered in the name of Islam by the Saffarids in the 9th century. The Tang dynasty of China controlled large parts of the region during the reign of Emperor Taizong of Tang and Emperor Gaozong of Tang. The Tibetan Empire also extended its influence into the region. The region fell to the Ghaznavids followed by the Ghurids before the Mongol invasion in the 13th century. After the Mongol invasion, the area was ruled by Arghun Khan of Ilkhanate, later by the Timurids and Mughals.

In 1709, when the Hotaki dynasty rose to power in Kandahar and defeated the Persian Safavids, Bamyan was under the Mughal Empire influence until Ahmad Shah Durrani made it become part of the Afghan Durrani Empire, which became what is now the modern state of Afghanistan.

During the 1980s Soviet-Afghan War, the Hazara rebel leader Abdul Ali Mazari began spreading influence. He founded the Hezbe Wahdat political party in 1989 and was killed by Taliban forces. By 1995, Bamyan province was under the control of the Taliban government. They were toppled by US-led forces in late 2001.

Recent history 

After the formation of the Karzai administration, Bamyan became the focus of rebuilding.

The remains of the Buddhist statues (destroyed by the Taliban) at Bamyan were included on the 2008 World Monuments Watch List of the 100 Most Endangered Sites by the World Monuments Fund. It is hoped that the listing will put continued national and international attention on the site as a whole (including, but not limited to, the statues) in order to ensure its long-term preservation, and to make certain that future restoration efforts maintain the authenticity of the site and that proper preservation practices are followed. Bamyan is also known as the capital of Daizangi and for its natural beauty.

It is recognized as one of the safest provinces in the country, which has allowed for civil rebuilding. Bamyan served as the base of operations for the New Zealand peacekeeping force, a Provincial Reconstruction Team codenamed Task Group Crib, which was part of the network of Provincial Reconstruction Teams throughout Afghanistan.

Transportation 

As of May 2014, the province was served by Bamyan Airport in Bamyan which had regularly scheduled direct flights to Kabul.

Economy

Agriculture 
Bamiyan has been particularly famous for its potatoes.  The region is also known for a "shuttle system" of planting, wherein seed potatoes are grown in winter in Jalalabad, a warm area of eastern Afghanistan, and then transferred to Bamyan for spring re-planting.

Tourism 
Prior to the Soviet invasion of 1979, the province attracted many tourists. Although this number is considerably fewer now, Bamyan is the first province in Afghanistan to have set up a tourist board, Bamyan Tourism. A feature of this developing tourist industry is based on skiing. The province is said to have 'some of the best "outback skiing" in the world and in 2008 an $1.2 million project to encourage skiing was launched by the Aga Khan Foundation (AKF) with the help of NZAID, New Zealand government's international aid agency. The province hosts the Afghan Ski Challenge, a 7 km downhill race over ungroomed and powdered snow, founded by Swiss journalist and skier Christoph Zurcher. Tissot, the Swiss watch manufacturer, is the principal sponsor.

Education 

Bamyan Province is home to the region's only university, Bamiyan University in the city of Bamyan. The school was founded in the mid-1990s, and largely destroyed under the Taliban and by US airstrikes. It was later refurbished by New Zealand Provincial Reconstruction Teams following the fall of the Taliban.

Demographics 

As of 2020, the total population of Bamyan province is around 495,557. Inhabitants of Bamyan are almost entirely Hazaras, but there is a small number of Tajiks living there too.

Districts 
The following is a list of the districts with the 202122 estimates of their settled population:

Gallery

See also 

 Hazarajat

References

External links 

 Bamyan Province - Naval Postgraduate School
 Bamyan Province by the Institute for the Study of War (ISW)
 Bamyan Development Community Portal for cultural heritage management of Bamyan
 Afghanistan Information Management Services - Bamyan Province
 Bamyan Tourism - Official site

 
Hazarajat
Sites along the Silk Road
Provinces of Afghanistan
Provinces of the Islamic Republic of Afghanistan